Dunlap Creek may refer to:

Dunlap Creek (Tuscarawas River), a stream in Ohio
Dunlap Creek (Duck River), a stream in Tennessee
Dunlap Creek (Virginia), a stream